"Fart-Break Hotel" is the ninth episode of the seventh season of American Dad!.  It originally aired on Fox in the United States on January 16, 2011. The episode follows housewife Francine as she becomes frustrated and bored with her daily routine of taking care of her family. But when Roger accidentally passes lethal gas in the house, the family moves into a luxury hotel for a week. While there, Francine decides to assume the identity and life of a familyless career woman, the CEO of a concrete company.

The episode was written by Chris and Matt McKenna, and directed by Rodney Clouden. It received mixed reception among television critics upon its release, with many going on to criticize the main storyline. It was viewed by 3.58 million homes upon its original airing. The episode features guest appearances from Héctor Elizondo, Will Forte, Richard Gant, Missi Pyle, Kevin Michael Richardson, J.K. Simmons, and Alan Tudyk.

Plot
Francine's daily routine starts to get to her when the family complains about dinner being prepared with the wrong vegetable (okra). She imagines herself killing the family in revenge; after Francine threatens them, they agree to eat the dinner anyway. Roger warns the family that he will have a bad reaction to the okra but eats it at Stan's urging. He farts a lethal gas during the middle of the night, prompting the family to leave their residence and stay at a hotel in Washington DC for a week, which they are allowed to do for free, as Roger once stayed at the hotel and suffered an accident. Discovering that she has never taken the time to get in touch with herself, Francine decides to spend the day assuming the identity of a recently deceased concrete saleswoman, Sarah Blanch. At the work convention in the hotel, Francine becomes more and more impressed with the exciting life she has fabricated for Sarah and fully assumes her identity. Roger, attending the convention as a depressed salesman named Pete Pendelman, highly advises against becoming too absorbed in her character, to no avail. She demonstrates business prowess that lands her a CEO job in Portland, Oregon. Francine decides to give up her former life and her family to pursue a new life as Sarah.

Meanwhile, at the hotel, Steve becomes drawn to a Patrick Nagel painting of a woman The concierge, Héctor Elizondo, explains that the portrait was painted in 1981 at the hotel. Steve is disappointed that he cannot meet the woman in the portrait, but Héctor tells him that if he uses the power of his mind, he can will himself to travel back in time to meet his dream girl. He successfully travels through time and meets Roger as his 80's persona Reaganomics Lamborghini, and witnesses the (fake) accident that led to their week of free rooming. Steve eventually meets Nagel, who drugs his champagne. He awakens naked on the bed and sees the painting of the woman.  Nagel explains that he painted Steve, revealing that Steve himself is the woman in the painting and the shock returns him to his own time. Héctor asks Steve if the woman in the painting was himself. When asked how he knew, Héctor reveals that he once fell in love; a painting of him as a woman is then shown.

Ten years in the future, after having accepted the CEO position, Francine is a successful but lonely old woman. On her way to another convention, she visits her old house and sees that Stan and Steve have moved on with their lives (Stan having married another woman). She returns to the hotel for another convention and admits to Héctor that she regrets her decision to change her life and abandon her family. Héctor tells her that with the power of her mind she can also travel back in time and stop herself. She does so and arrives in the present, telling present-Francine not to accept the job and convincing her to stay with her current life with her family. Francine returns to her life as usual, but decides to make every Thursday her personal day away from her usual routine.

Reception
"Fart-Break Hotel" was broadcast on January 16, 2011, as a part of an animated television night on Fox, and was the first show on the line-up, followed by The Simpsons, Bob's Burgers, and its sister shows Family Guy, and The Cleveland Show. It was on a new timeslot of 7:30, as opposed to be the last episode in the Fox Animation Domination line-up. It was watched by 3.58 million viewers, according to Nielsen ratings, despite airing simultaneously with America's Funniest Home Videos on ABC, the 2011 NFL playoffs on CBS and the Golden Globe Awards on NBC. The episode also acquired a 1.7 rating in the 18–49 demographic, the lowest rating of the line-up, in addition to having significantly lower ratings in total viewership. The episode's ratings decreased significantly from the previous episode.

"Fart-Break Hotel" was met with mixed response from most television critics. Rowan Kaiser of The A.V. Club wrote, "There are some conceptual jokes that inspire smiles, like the magical, Platonic concierge, and a few good lines but not much beyond that to salvage a tired premise." However, Kaiser made some positive comments on the opening scene of the episode. He went on to give the episode a C, scoring lower than The Simpsons episode "Flaming Moe", tying with The Cleveland Show episode "How Do You Solve a Problem Like Roberta?", and Bob's Burgers episode "Crawl Space", while scoring higher than the Family Guy episode "And I'm Joyce Kinney". Jason Hughes of the TV Squad also gave it a slightly more positive review, going on to praise the side story. He wrote, "The side story featuring Steve traveling back to 1981 was clever, if not terribly original. It seemed to have elements of Hot Tub Time Machine and Back to the Future and probably some others I'm not remembering, and culminated in the anticlimax of Steve being the model in the painting he so admired." However, he was more critical on the main plot, writing, "Francine's journey wasn't terribly unique either, and again it was odd seeing Roger stand in as the voice of reason. It's as if all the elements that make the Smith family who they are were switched around, and the show wasn't made better because of it."

References

External links

2011 American television episodes
American Dad! (season 7) episodes
Flatulence in popular culture
Fiction set in 1981